Events in the year 2023 in Greece.

Incumbents 

 President: Katerina Sakellaropoulou
 Prime Minister: Kyriakos Mitsotakis

Events 

 5 January – Aegean dispute: A Turkish coast guard vessel exchanges warning shots with a Greek coast guard vessel off the Greek island of Farmakonisi.
 10 January – Constantine II, dies at age 82. He was the last Greek monarch, reigning from 1964 to 1973.
 27 January – Greek wiretapping scandal of 2022: Greek prime minister Kyriakos Mitsotakis survives a no-confidence vote called by former prime minister Alexis Tsipras over the scandal.

 8 February – The Greek Parliament votes to ban National Party – Greeks from running in the coming elections. The New Democracy (Greece), PASOK voted for it, while the Communist Party of Greece, Greek Solution and MeRA25 voted against.   
 28 February – Tempi train crash: A passenger train and a freight train collide in Tempi, Larissa, Thessaly, killing 57 people and injuring more than 85 others.

 1 March – Two people are killed after a boat carrying around 30 migrants capsizes near the coast of Kos. 
 2023 Greek legislative election.

Sports 

 20 June – 2 July – 2023 Men's Junior World Handball Championship
 19 August 2022 – 14 May 2023: 2022–23 Super League Greece
 2 – 9 September – 2023  Mediterranean Beach Games

Deaths 

 1 January – Apostolos Pitsos, 104, industrialist and businessman.
 3 January – 
 Nikos Skylakakis, 99, basketball player (national team).
 Notis Mavroudis, 77, guitarist and composer
 10 January – 
 Irenaios, 83, Orthodox prelate, patriarch of the Greek Orthodox Church of Jerusalem (2001–2005).
 Constantine II, 82, last king of the Hellenes (r. 1964–1973).

 17 January – Paul Soulikias, 96, Greek-Canadian painter.
 20 January – Elena Apergi, 90, actress (Madalena, Ena Exypno Exypno Moutro).
 21 January – Erricos Andreou, 84, film director (The Hook, Act of Reprisal) and screenwriter.
 22 January – Nikos Xanthopoulos, 88, actor and singer.
 24 January – Metropolitan Panteleimon of Belgium, 87, Orthodox prelate, metropolitan of Belgium (1982–2013).
 2 February – John Zizioulas, 92, Orthodox prelate, metropolitan of Pergamon (since 1986).
 8 February – Manousos Voloudakis, 56, politician, MP (2007–2009, 2012–2014, since 2019).
 9 February – Sasa Zivoulovic, 50, Olympic handball player (2004).
 13 February – Nektarios Santorinios, 50, politician, MP (since 2015).
 16 February –
 Despoina Nikolaidou, 88–89, actress (A Matter of Dignity, And the Wife Shall Revere Her Husband, Agonia).
 Stratis Stratigis, 89, lawyer and politician, MP (1985–1989).
17 February – Moses Elisaf, 68, politician, mayor of Ioannina (since 2019).
20 February – George B. Dertilis, 84, historian.
22 February – Giorgos Katsoulis, 60, water polo player (Olympiacos) and coach.

References 

 
2020s in Greece
Years of the 21st century in Greece
Greece
Greece